Bhonga is an Indian Marathi-language drama film Produced by   Amol Laxman Kagne, Shivaji Lotan Patil and Arun Hiraman Mahajan. directed by Shivaji Lotan Patil and written by the director himself and Nishant Natharam Dhapse. Ramani Das has choreographed all songs. It features Amol Kagane and Dipti Dhotre in lead roles. The film also stars Kapil Kamble and Shripad Joshi. The film has managed to win a total of five awards like Best Picture, at the Maharashtra State Government's 56th Film Awards. The film also won the Best Marathi Film award in the feature film category, at 66th National Film Awards.

Story 
The film revolves around a middle-class Muslim family where a nine-month-old baby is suffering from a chronic disease named Cerebral hypoxia. This disease causes the amount of oxygen in the blood starts to drop and it impacts the brain. The family decides to leave their home and transfers to another place due to financial difficulties. The new house stands back from a mosque. The movie then recounts the story of the child's father, uncle, and other villagers.

Casts 

 Amol Kagane
 Dipti Dhotre
 Kapil Kamble
 Shripad Joshi

Development 
A solo poster of Amol Kagne was revealed in August 2019.

Accolades

References 
 6.

External links 
 
 

2020s Marathi-language films
Indian drama films
Best Marathi Feature Film National Film Award winners
2021 drama films